Donald C. Pennington is a British psychologist and was pro-vice-chancellor of Coventry University. He is the author of a number of psychology textbooks.

References 

British psychologists
Living people
Academics of Coventry University
Year of birth missing (living people)